Vâlsan may refer to:

 Vâlsan, a tributary of the river Argeș in Romania
 Costești-Vâlsan, a village in Mușătești Commune, Argeș County, Romania
 George Vâlsan, Romanian geographer